= Om Yentieng =

Om Yentieng is the head of Cambodia's anti-corruption unit.
